Colobopterus is a genus of scarab beetles in the family Scarabaeidae. There are about six described species in Colobopterus, found in Asia, Europe, and North America.

Species
These six species belong to the genus Colobopterus:
 Colobopterus brignolii (Carpaneto, 1973)
 Colobopterus erraticus (Linnaeus, 1758)
 Colobopterus indagator (Mannerheim, 1849)
 Colobopterus notabilipennis Petrovitz, 1972
 Colobopterus propraetor (Balthasar, 1932)
 Colobopterus quadratus (Reiche, 1847)

References

External links

 

Scarabaeidae
Scarabaeidae genera
Taxa named by Étienne Mulsant